The 1998 Wellington local elections were part of the 1998 New Zealand local elections, to elect members to sub-national councils and boards. The Wellington elections cover one regional council (the Greater Wellington Regional Council), eight territorial authority (city and district) councils, three district health boards, and various community boards and licensing trusts. The polling was conducted using the standard first-past-the-post electoral method.

Greater Wellington Regional Council

Wellington Ward
The Wellington ward returns five councillors to the Wellington Regional Council.

Wellington City Council
The Wellington City Council consists of a mayor and eighteen councillors elected from six wards (Eastern, Lambton, Northern, Onslow, Southern, Western).

Mayor

Eastern ward
The Eastern ward returns four councillors to the Wellington City Council. The final results for the ward were:

Lambton ward
The Lambton ward returns three councillors to the Wellington City Council. The final results for the ward were:

Northern ward
The Northern ward returns four councillors to the Wellington City Council. The final results for the ward were:

Onslow ward
The Onslow ward returns two councillors to the Wellington City Council. The final results for the ward were:

Southern ward
The Southern ward returns three councillors to the Wellington City Council. The final results for the ward were:

Western ward
The Western ward returns two councillors to the Wellington City Council. The final results for the ward were:

References

Wellington
Politics of the Wellington Region
Wellington
1990s in Wellington